Eugen Hach (born 19 September 1960) is a German football manager and former player who played as a defender.

References

1960 births
Living people
German footballers
1. FC Kaiserslautern II players
FK Pirmasens players
Alemannia Aachen players
1. FC Saarbrücken players
Association football defenders
2. Bundesliga players
German football managers
Alemannia Aachen managers
SpVgg Greuther Fürth managers
1. FC Saarbrücken managers
SV Waldhof Mannheim managers
Rot-Weiß Oberhausen managers
SV Eintracht Trier 05 managers